Luca Belcastro (born 23 April 1991) is an Italian professional footballer who plays as a midfielder for  club Arzignano.

Club career
Born in Locri, Belcastro was formed in Juventus Primavera.

On 14 July 2011, he left Juventus and joined to Carrarese. He made his Serie C debut on 21 September 2011 against Cremonese.

On 22 July 2017, he signed for Imolese. He played for three seasons in the club, and won the promotion to Serie C in 2017–18 Serie D season.

On 3 October 2020, he joined Serie D club Trento as a free agent. He won the promotion to Serie C on his first season.

On 4 January 2023, Belcastro moved to Arzignano.

Honours
Viterbese
 Serie D: 2015–16

References

External links
 
 

1991 births
Living people
People from Locri
Sportspeople from the Metropolitan City of Reggio Calabria
Footballers from Calabria
Italian footballers
Association football midfielders
Serie C players
Serie D players
Carrarese Calcio players
U.S. Viterbese 1908 players
Imolese Calcio 1919 players
A.C. Trento 1921 players
F.C. Arzignano Valchiampo players